Eugen Kling (14 February 1899 – 21 December 1971) was a German international footballer.

References

1899 births
1971 deaths
Association football defenders
German footballers
Germany international footballers
TSV 1860 Munich players